El Tiempo Es Oro may refer to:

El Tiempo Es Oro (album), by Paulina Rubio
El Tiempo Es Oro (game show), a Puerto Rican game show